Rohinchandra, also known as Harshachandra Singh, Labeinya Chandra and Rabino Chandra (died 1801) was a Manipuri King who ruled between 1798 and 1801. He was the son of Bhagya Chandra.

See also
List of Manipuri kings
Manipur (princely state)

References

External links
The Medieval Period - IIT Guwahati

Meitei royalty
1810 deaths
Hindu monarchs
Year of birth unknown